The , which means Nikkei Industrial Journal, is a Japanese daily newspaper published on weekdays by Nihon Keizai Shimbun, Inc. The paper was launched in 1973. It presents news in regard to the Japanese manufacturing sector. As of 2002 the circulation of the paper was 270,000 copies.

References

Further reading

External links
Nikkei Business Daily

1973 establishments in Japan
Business newspapers
Daily newspapers published in Japan
Publications established in 1973